Marian Kajzerek (born August 27, 1946) is a former Polish ice hockey player. He played for the Poland men's national ice hockey team at the 1976 Winter Olympics in Innsbruck.

References

1946 births
Living people
Ice hockey players at the 1976 Winter Olympics
Olympic ice hockey players of Poland
Sportspeople from Katowice
Polish ice hockey centres